Datuk Seri Ramlan bin Ibrahim (born 6 January 1957) is a current member of the Election Commission of Malaysia and a former Secretary-General of the Ministry of Foreign Affairs of Malaysia. He is the 15th person to hold the post since the establishment of the Ministry in 1956.

A career diplomat, Ramlan was previously the country's Permanent Representative to the United Nations in New York. His stint in New York coincided with Malaysia's membership to the United Nations Security Council, as one of its ten non-permanent members.

Early life and education
Ramlan was born in Penang, a state in the north of Malaysia, in 1957.

He obtained a bachelor's degree from the National University of Malaysia (UKM), and a Masters in International Relations from Webster University.

Career
Ramlan entered the Administrative and Diplomatic Service of Malaysia in 1983. His first posting was as Second Secretary to the Embassy of Malaysia in Jakarta in 1988. Two years later, he was reassigned to the Embassy of Malaysia in the Netherlands, but as First Secretary. In 1994, Ramlan returned to the headquarters and was assigned to the Europe Division. It was not long before the Ministry sent him on another posting - this time as the Chargé d'Affaires ad interim in the Embassy of Malaysia in Zagreb, Croatia.

He returned three years later, in 2000, to become the Principal Assistant Secretary at the Division of South East Asia. The following year, Ramlan was appointed as Deputy High Commissioner to Singapore.

His first posting as an Ambassador was to Bosnia Herzegovina, in 2004. When he returned to the Ministry in 2006, he was appointed as the Undersecretary of the Americas Division, before becoming Undersecretary of South East Asia Division in quick succession.

In 2009, Ramlan was again appointed Ambassador of Malaysia - this time to the Republic of Korea. His return from Korea in 2013 saw him heading the Bilateral Department, the second-highest post in the Malaysian foreign service.

His services were needed elsewhere however, and in April 2015, Ramlan was appointed as Malaysia's Permanent Representative to the United Nations in New York. Malaysia was at the time a member of the Security Council, thus Ramlan was also Malaysia's Permanent Representative in the Council, the highest decision-making organ of the United Nations. Malaysia became President of the Security Council twice, in April 2015 and August 2016. As Ambassador, Ramlan presided over those meetings, only relinquishing the responsibility when the Deputy Prime Minister or Foreign Minister was in New York for the session.

At the UNSC
Ramlan's first task upon taking up the post in New York in April 2015 was to preside over UN Security Council. In fact, Ramlan's arrival to New York as Permanent Representative of Malaysia to the United Nations coincided with Malaysia's first tenure as President of the Security Council, in April 2015.

At the Security Council, Ramlan was also Chair of the Security Council's Working Group on Children and Armed Conflict, and held open debates on the subject on 18 June 2015 and 2 August 2016. UN Resolution 2225 on 'children and armed conflict' was adopted with a unanimous vote during Malaysia's Chairmanship in 2015.

In the closing days of the Malaysia's tenure at the UN Security Council in December 2016, a draft resolution on the issue of Palestine was circulated. The draft condemned the illegal Israeli settlement in the Occupied Territories, and was tabled by Egypt, on behalf of other co-sponsors. When Egypt found itself "under immense pressure", Malaysia stepped in to ensure that the draft resolution was not derailed. Other co-sponsors - Senegal, Venezuela, and New Zealand - remained steadfast and the draft resolution was finally put to a vote on 23 December 2016. In a historic decision not seen in nearly 36 years, the UN Security Council managed to adopt the resolution (now known as United Nations Security Council Resolution 2334 with a vote of 14 in favour and one abstention (the United States). The adoption of Resolution 2334  is seen as a victory for Malaysia, and particularly for Ramlan, who with the support of Malaysian Prime Minister Najib Razak and Minister Anifah Aman, was able to canvas support for a non-veto resolution.

As MFA Secretary General
Ramlan was appointed as Secretary General of the Ministry of Foreign Affairs on 1 January 2017 and received his letter of appointment from the Chief Secretary to the Government, Tan Sri Dr Ali Hamsa.

Barely two months into his stewardship, Malaysia was plunged into a standoff with North Korea over the death of a North Korean citizen, rumored to be Kim Jong-nam, the estranged brother of Kim Jong-il. Ramlan's was tasked with spearheading the negotiations to free the 11 Malaysians held captive by the Pyongyang regime.

Ramlan became the first top management officer at the Ministry of Foreign Affairs Malaysia to establish his own Twitter account in line with his own vision of making the service more transparent and social media-friendly.

Awards and honours
  : 
  Commander of the Order of Meritorious Service (PJN) - Datuk (2017)
  :
  Knight Companion of the Order of Loyalty to the Royal House of Kedah (DSDK) - Dato' (2008)
  :
  Grand Knight of the Order of Sultan Ahmad Shah of Pahang (SSAP) - Dato' Sri (2017)
  :
  Commander of the Order of the Defender of State (DGPN) - Datuk Seri (2017)
  :
 Honorary Citizen of Seoul (2012)

References

1957 births
Webster University alumni
Ministry of Foreign Affairs (Malaysia)
Living people
Commanders of the Order of Meritorious Service
Ambassadors of Malaysia to Bosnia and Herzegovina
Ambassadors of Malaysia to Croatia